The 3rd Critics' Choice Real TV Awards, presented by the Broadcast Television Journalists Association and NPACT, which recognizes excellence in nonfiction, unscripted and reality programming across broadcast, cable and streaming platforms, were held on June 21, 2021. The nominations were announced on June 2, 2021.

Winners and nominees
Winners are listed first and highlighted in bold:

Programs

Personality

Achievement

Most major nominations
Programs that received multiple nominations are listed below, by number of nominations per work and per network:

Most major wins

References

2021 television awards
2021 in American television
 003
June 2021 events in the United States